Mustafa Kamal Mahmoud Hussein (December 27, 1921 – 31 October 2009) commonly known as Mustafa Mahmoud was an Egyptian doctor, philosopher, and author. Mustafa was born in Shibin el-Kom, Monufia province, Egypt. He was trained as a doctor, but later chose a career as a journalist and author, traveling and writing on many subjects. He wrote 89 books on science, philosophy, religion, politics, and society as well as plays, tales, and travelogues.

He is also known for his popular program . Mustafa also founded a mosque, a medical clinic, and a charitable organization which were all named after him.

Biography
The material in this section is derived from self-published information by the subject.

Early life
Mustafa Mahmoud was raised in a middle-class family; his father was employed as a secretary in the province of El Gharbiyya. In elementary school, he struggled in class failing to graduate for three consecutive years. One of his teachers is said to have abused him physically, which affected his learning and made him drop out of school for a while. 

He was ill often and restricted from playing with other children. Being introverted in nature, Mustafa spent his early days immersed in his own imagination. He dreamed of being a great inventor, explorer, or famous scientist; with his role models being Christopher Columbus, Edison, Marconi , and Pasteur.

Medical studies
Mustafa Mahmud chose medicine as his field of study. 

In his third year of studies, he was admitted to the hospital for three years of treatment. He describes this long isolation as a positive contribution to the development of his character when he could indulge himself totally in reading and thinking of literary works. In these three years, the meditative character was fashioned within himself, and thus the writer was born.

After his recovery, he resumed his medical studies and says that he subsequently realized an immense change within himself. He discovered within himself the artist who reflects, reads, and peruses regularly the major sources of literature, plays, and novels. Owing to this new activity, (which in no time he became an expert at), he began to write regularly to the newspapers, (in his final year of medicine). Accordingly, he had to intensify his effort to graduate and attain success. He started writing for El Tahrir and Rose El Yusef magazines. Due to his illness, he graduated two or three years after his colleagues, in 1953.

Journeys 
Mustafa Mahmud describes his frequent travels, starting with his journeys to the Tropics in Tanzania, Uganda, Kenya, and the south of Sudan, where he stayed for two months with the tribe of Niam Niam. Thereafter, he traveled to the Sahara Desert, to the oasis of Ghadamis, where he stayed for a month with the tribe of El Tawariq. Furthermore, he traveled to many capitals of European and American countries, such as Italy, Germany, Greece, France, Canada, and the United States; and to the Arab countries, beginning with Morocco and Algeria in the west; and ending with Lebanon, Syria and Saudi Arabia in the east.

There was another journey, one within himself; he boarded the ship of science, knowledge, and religion (starting from the Indian Fideism, Zoroaster, and Buddha; and ending with Moses, Jesus, and Muhammad. Finally, he found his comfort and himself in the Qur'an. Thus, he concluded his traveling and devoted himself totally to reflection and contemplation. He lived among the jurists, scholars, and Sufis, and found that the Qur'an is an ocean around which all the branches of knowledge gather together.

He wrote five books criticizing Marxist thought: Islamic left Fib; Marxism and Islam; Leftism Collapse; Why Did I Refuse Marxism? and The Antichrist. He was persuaded that Marxism was one of the pickaxes which destroyed the current civilization; at worst, it was an instrument that caused the creation of a spiteful, negative, and rejecting character. He has seventy-five books published, six of them were adapted for stage: (Earthquake; Man, and Shade; The Great Alexander; The Social Gang (Shilla-t 'Uns); Blood Odor; The Devil Lives in our House), of them (The Impossible) was presented as a film; twenty-five books deal with Islamic subjects, and the rest consists of studies and short stories. 
TV presented for him more than four hundred episodes of the program "Science and Faith", in which the movie, scientific substance, and Sufi meditation guide us to faith in God.

In the year 1960, he left his medical career, devoting himself totally to writing for newspapers. As a physician, moved from one hospital to another (particularly, among the Hospitals of Chest Diseases in Abbasiyya, Chest diseases in 'Almazha, Chest diseases in Dumyat, and the dispensary of Umm el-Masriyyeen), between the years 1953 and 1960, all had a great influence on his writings, principally: Storehouse No. 7 (`Anbar 7), the Social Gang (Shilla-t 'Uns), and Eating Bread (Akl-`Aysh). In the meantime, it had an influence on his scientific and anatomical access to the public adversities, to the human soul, and to the characters, he dealt with in all his writings.

Another character who had a profound effect on him was his father, whose long-time illness, patience, faith, and pure innate nature remained in his mind throughout his life. As he grew older and encountered life's affairs in his thirties, a woman played a great role in and had an effectual control on his life, as a friend, a dialogist, and a lover. His faults were always due to losing control of himself when he looked at beautiful things. Above all, he believed that no man is a perfect one unless he has found a woman to love, marry, have children with, and to feel parenthood, and establish a family.

Marriage 
Mustafa Mahmud says that his first marriage in 1961 was not successful, though, from it, he was endowed with a girl and a boy, Amal and Adham. The marriage ended in 1973. His second marriage in 1983 was also unsuccessful and ended in 1987. The reasons behind these divorces were his passion for writing that controlled his life, his preoccupation with his work, and finally his isolation.

Publications

Books

(2004): Understanding The Qur'an : A Contemporary Approach (1999): What's Behind The Gate of Death
(1998): The Password (1998): New Quranic Psychology 
(1997): Israel: The Beginning and The End(1995): The Burning Tomorrow
(1994): Islam in the Dike(1992): I Saw God 
(1992): Political Islam and the Upcoming Battle (1991): Political Circus Games
(1990): Reading for the future (1989): The Perplexed Question (1985): Bahai Facts (1984): Marxism and Islam 
(1984): Gentlemen, Unveil These Masks! (1984): What is Islam? 
(1982): From America to the other Shore (1981): Dialog Antara Muslim Dan Atheis (1978): The Quran: A Living Creature
(1978): Age of Monkeys(1978): The Lie About the Left Islamist Groups 
(1976): Existence and Nonentity(1975): Muhammad 
(1975): The Greatest Secret(1974): Dialogue with an Atheist
(1972): Allah (1972): The Torah
(1970): My journey from Doubt to Belief (1969): The Quran - An Attempt to a Modern Understanding
(1961): Einstein and Relativity (1959): Death mystery

Articles 

(1992): The World of Secrets (1985): The Devil Rules
(1982): Is It The Age of Insanity? (1979): Fire under the ashes
(1973): The Spirit & The Body (1966): In Love and Life

Short stories 

(1979): The Antichrist (1966): The Smell of Blood
(1964): The Social Gang(1954): Eating Bread

Novels 

(1966): A Man Less Than Zero(1965): Getting out of the Coffin
(1965): The Spider(1964): Opium
In (1963), he wrote The Earthquake, a play criticizing the Gamal Abdel Nasser regime. Years later, it was released in theaters and starred actor Salah Zulfikar in 1990.(1960): The Impossible

Plays 

(1996): A Visit to Heaven and Hell(1982): The Smallest Hell-fire 
(1973): The Leader(1973): The Devil Lives in our House
(1964): The Human and the Shadow(1963): The Earthquake 
(1963): Alexander The Great

 Travel literature (1971): The Road to the Kaaba
(1971): Traveler Stories (1969): Adventure in the Desert
''(1963): The Forest

Memorials, honors, and awards
 1995 Literature 
 Mustafa Mahmud Square, Cairo, Egypt
 Asteroid 296753 Mustafamahmoud, discovered by Russian amateur astronomer Timur Kryachko at the Zelenchukskaya Station in 2009, was named in his memory. The official  was published by the Minor Planet Center on 12 July 2014.

References

External links
Science and Faith episodes in a Youtube playlist
The Astronomical Society of Mahmoud Mosque
A documentary produced by Al Jazeera Documentary Channel about Life of Mustafa Mahmoud-Part 1/2
A documentary produced by Al Jazeera Documentary Channel about Life of Mustafa Mahmoud-Part 2/2

Mujaddid
1921 births
2009 deaths
Egyptian writers
People from Monufia Governorate
20th-century Egyptian physicians
20th-century Egyptian writers
21st-century Egyptian writers
Converts to Islam from atheism or agnosticism
Former Marxists
Critics of atheism